¡All-Time Quarterback! is the first album and the last release from Ben Gibbard's solo project ¡All-Time Quarterback!. It is a collection of tracks from the now out of print EPs ¡All-Time Quarterback! and The Envelope Sessions. Oddly, the ¡All-Time Quarterback! album excludes the tracks "Don't Touch the Tape", "Lullaby, Lullaby", "Dig It!" and "Stark Mobile," despite its short album length. However, it includes the previously unreleased track "Dinner At Eight in the Suburbs".

The enhanced CD features the video for "Plans Get Complex", filmed in London and edited by Aaron Stewart.

Track listing

Trivia
The track "Underwater!" went on to become a Death Cab for Cutie song, released on 7" vinyl as part of the Sub Pop Singles Club (March 2000).

Credits
Ben Gibbard – all instruments and vocals
Nick helped by playing percussion on "Untitled".
Drums on "Why I Cry" were looped from a Rat Cat Hogan song, and, as such, were played by Rob.
"Why I Cry" is a Magnetic Fields song written by Stephin Merritt, copyright 1995.

References

¡All-Time Quarterback! compilation albums
2002 compilation albums
Barsuk Records compilation albums